Pennings is a surname. Notable people with the surname include:

Jeannette Pennings (born 1977), Dutch bobsledder, sister of Wilbert
Steven Pennings, American biologist and biochemist 
Wilbert Pennings (born 1975), Dutch high-jumper

See also
Penning (disambiguation)